Capusa cuculloides, the white-winged wedge-moth, is a moth of the family Geometridae first described by Rudolf Felder  in 1874. It is known from Australia.

Adults have pale grey wings with dark veins. It folds its wings along its back when at rest.

The larvae feed on the foliage of Eucalyptus species. Young larvae are green with a dark brown dorsal line on the thorax, dark brown dashes on the abdomen, and white spiracles with red outlines. Later instars are reddish.

References

Nacophorini